Homes & Gardens is a British monthly interior design and garden design magazine published by Future plc. The magazine is based in London and has been in circulation since 1919. As the UK’s first-ever home interest magazine, Homes & Gardens has been shaping British style for over 100 years. While the magazine largely speaks to a British audience, it does have readers around the world. The Homes & Gardens website, however, speaks primarily to a global audience, prioritizing an American readership.

Homes & Gardens magazine and website (www.homesandgardens.com) have distinct core pillars: inspirational interiors, stylish decorating, beautiful gardens and expert advice from contributing interior designers. With the values of timeless style and considered elegance, there is an affection for British heritage but also a broad range of content that appeals to global readers, from emerging designers to latest trends to homemaking. The website is updated and added to daily and welcomes more than 7.5 million readers monthly.

History and profile
The magazine was launched in 1919. The magazine is based in London and is published on a monthly basis. It has been edited by Lucy Searle since 2020.

References

External links
 

Design magazines
Monthly magazines published in the United Kingdom
English-language magazines
Magazines published in London
Magazines established in 1919